14th OTO Awards

SND, Bratislava, Slovakia

Overall winner  Marcel Merčiak

Hall of Fame  Juraj Kukura

Život Award  Pavol Barabáš

◄ 13th | 15th ►

The 14th OTO Awards, honoring the best in Slovak popular culture for the year 2013, took time and place on 8 March 2014 at the Slovak National Theater in Bratislava. The ceremony broadcast live RTVS on Jednotka, the hosts of the show were Adela Banášová and Matej "Sajfa" Cifra.

Winners and nominees

Main categories
 Television

 Music

Others

Superlatives

Multiple nominees
 2 nominations
 Ján Mečiar
 Marcel Merčiak

Reception

TV ratings
The show has received a total audience of more than 551,000 viewers, making it the most watched television program within prime time in the region.

References

External links
 Archive > OTO 2013 – 14th edition  (Official website)
 Winners (at Pravda)
 Winners and nominees (at Hospodárske noviny)

14th
2013 in Slovak music
2013 in Slovak television
2013 television awards